Zhavoronkovo is a rural locality (a village) in Yugskoye Rural Settlement, Cherepovetsky District, Vologda Oblast, Russia. The population was 14 as of 2002.

Geography 
Zhavoronkovo is located 46 km southeast of Cherepovets (the district's administrative centre) by road. Piyevo is the nearest rural locality.

References 

Rural localities in Cherepovetsky District